Finn McCool's Football Club - The Birth, Death and Resurrection of a Pub Soccer Team in the City of the Dead is the title of a nonfiction memoir book written by Belfast author Stephen Rea and released in February 2009 by Pelican Publishing Company.

The bulk of the book's time-line stretches from 2004 until 2006. It humorously relates how Rea and his American wife emigrate from Northern Ireland to New Orleans, and the difficulties they encounter in adapting to their new life. Soon he becomes a regular at Finn McCool's, an Irish pub in Mid-City, New Orleans, and the book introduces the eccentric, international crowd that gathers there to watch European football games. Six months later they form a pub soccer team.

Approximately halfway into the book the tone changes. After seven months of training the team are about to play competitively when Hurricane Katrina slams into the city on August 29, 2005. The narrative follows the harrowing stories of players, drinkers and pub staff as they are plucked from roofs or forced to swim out of the city. Rea and his friends are scattered around the world.

Slowly they return to New Orleans and rebuild their team, their pub and their lives. The book's final chapters deal with life in the surreal landscape of immediate post-Katrina New Orleans, a city missing basic amenities like hospitals, schools, garbage pickup and traffic lights.

The book has received positive reviews both in the US and the UK and sold more than 2,000 copies in the first three months of release.

References

External links
Stephen Rea's (the author) web-site

Association football books
2009 non-fiction books
Books about Hurricane Katrina